Lawrence Blackledge (born November 24, 1985) is an American professional basketball player. Nicknamed Lawrence "Trend" Blackledge.

The Basketball Tournament
Lawrence Blackledge played for the Golden Eagles in the 2018 edition of The Basketball Tournament. In 5 games, he averaged 3.4 points, 3.4 rebounds, and 1.2 blocks per game. The Golden Eagles reached the semi-finals before falling to Overseas Elite.

Career statistics 

|-
| align="left" | 2010–11
| align="left" | Osaka
| 42 || 15 || 24.2 || 52.4 || 34.1 || 53.3 || 7.7 || 1.6 || 1.1 || 2.2 || 10.2
|-
| align="left" | 2011–12
| align="left" | Osaka
| 22 || 22 || 31.5 || 40.7 || 22.2 || 53.7 || 10.0 || 3.2 || 1.3 || 3.0 ||  9.4
|-
| align="left" | 2011–12
| align="left" | Hamamatsu
| 28 || 28 || 19.8 || 49.3 || 22.2 || 53.8 || 5.2 || 1.2 || 0.9 || 2.1 ||  9.1
|-
| align="left" | 2012–13
| align="left" | Iwate
| 32 || 22 || 27.1|| 52.5|| 18.2|| 51.7|| 9.2 || 1.9 || 0.8 || 2.6 || 11.9
|-
| align="left" | 2013–14
| align="left" | Iwate
| 52 || 50 || 30.0 || 48.1 || 5.9|| 52.9|| 7.4 || 2.8 || 1.6 || 2.0 ||  13.9
|-
| align="left" | 2014–15
| align="left" | Iwate
| 52 || 52 || 30.9 || 48.5 || 22.6 || 61.8 || 9.1 || 3.0 || 1.5 || 1.9 ||  14.6
|-
| align="left" | 2015–16
| align="left" | Osaka
| 52 || 50 || 31.9 || 47.5 || 26.6 || 60.1 || 7.2 || 3.9 || 1.8 || 1.9 ||  14.4
|-
| align="left" | 2016–17
| align="left" | Ehime
| 45 || 3 || 23.2 || 41.7 ||20.0  ||63.5  || 5.8 ||2.2  ||1.2  ||1.8  ||10.8
|-
| align="left" | 2017–18
| align="left" | San-en
|8  ||0  ||10.9  ||45.5  || 0.0 || 80.0 || 2.9 ||0.5  ||0.4  || 1.2 ||10.9
|-
| align="left" | 2017–18
| align="left" | Kyoto
|6  || 0 || 6.2 ||50.0  ||50.0  ||57.1  || 1.0 || 0.7 ||0.2  ||0.2  || 6.2
|-
| style="background-color:#FFCCCC" align="left" | 2017–18
| align="left" | Iwate
| 29 || 1 ||21.4  ||39.2  || 23.6 || 59.2 || 5.1 || 1.7 || 1.0 || 1.4 || 11.3
|-
|}

References

1985 births
Living people
American expatriate basketball people in Canada
American expatriate basketball people in Chile
American expatriate basketball people in Japan
American men's basketball players
Ehime Orange Vikings players
Iwate Big Bulls players
Kyoto Hannaryz players
Marquette Golden Eagles men's basketball players
Osaka Evessa players
Power forwards (basketball)
San-en NeoPhoenix players